Mullings is a surname. Notable people with this surname include:

 Daniel Mullings (born 1991), Canadian basketball player
 Darren Mullings (born 1987), English semi-professional football player
 Devin Mullings (born 1985), Bahamian tennis player
 Emma Mullings, Australian television presenter, radio announcer, singer, actor, writer and producer
 Frank Mullings (1881–1953), English tenor
 John Mullings Aldridge, Irish priest
 Joseph Mullings (1792–1859), British politician
 Joseph Mullings (cricketer) (born 1874), Jamaican cricket player
 Keith Mullings (1968–2021), Jamacian boxer
 Leith Mullings (1945–2020), American author, anthropologist and professor
 Leonard Mullings (born 1929), Jamaican cricket player
 Patrick Mullings (born 1970), English amateur boxer
 Seymour Mullings OJ CD (1931–2013), Jamaican politician
 Shamir Mullings (born 1993), English football player
 Steve Mullings (born 1982), Jamaican sprinter